Robert Fowler may refer to:
 Robert Fowler (archbishop of Dublin) (1724–1801), bishop in the Church of Ireland
 Robert Fowler (artist) (1853–1926), English artist
 Robert Fowler (athlete) (1882–1957), American marathoner
 Robert Fowler (Australian politician) (1840–1906), New South Wales politician
 Robert Fowler (bishop of Ossory) (1766–1841), bishop in the Church of Ireland; son of the Archbishop of Dublin
 Robert Fowler (cyclist) (1931–2001), South African Olympic cyclist
 Robert Fowler (diplomat) (born 1944), Canadian diplomat
 Robert Fowler (surgeon, soldier) (1888–1965), Australian surgeon and soldier
 Robert William Doughty Fowler (born 1914), United Kingdom Ambassador to Sudan
 Sir Robert Fowler, 1st Baronet (1828–1891), Lord Mayor of London
 Robert George Fowler (1884–1966), American aviation pioneer
 Robert Henry Fowler (1857–1957), Irish cricketer; great-grandson of the Bishop of Ossory
 Robert St Leger Fowler (1891–1925), Irish cricketer; son of the above
 H. Robert Fowler (1851–1926), U.S. politician
 Robbie Fowler (born 1975), English footballer
 Bobby Jack Fowler (1939–2006), American criminal
 Robert Merrick Fowler (1778–1860), officer of the Royal Navy
 Robert Fowler (academic) (born 1954), classicist